Richard Nash or Ash (died 1394/95), of Hereford, was an English politician.

He was a Member (MP) of the Parliament of England for Hereford in January 1377, 1379, January 1380, 1381 and October 1383, and for Herefordshire in November 1384, February 1388 and November 1390.

References

Year of birth missing
1395 deaths
English MPs January 1377
People from Hereford
English MPs 1379
English MPs January 1380
English MPs 1381
English MPs October 1383
English MPs November 1384
English MPs February 1388
English MPs November 1390